St. Paul's Parish is a congregation of the Episcopal Church in Batesville, Arkansas. The parish was officially founded on March 3, 1866, by Bishop Henry C. Lay and the Rev. Charles H. Albert, who had been working as missionaries in the area since the previous year.

Its historic parish church is located at 424 East Main Street. Designed by noted Arkansas architect Charles L. Thompson, it was built in 1916 to replace the original 1869 structure. Its main block is a cruciform stone structure with Gothic Revival styling, and a squat square tower located at the inside corner of the nave and eastern transept. The main entrance is set at the northern end of the nave, in a segmented-arch opening set in a low projecting section.  The gable end above the entrance has a large Gothic-arched stained glass window. The building was listed on the National Register of Historic Places in 1982.

See also
National Register of Historic Places listings in Independence County, Arkansas

References

External links
St. Paul's Episcopal Church web site

Churches on the National Register of Historic Places in Arkansas
Gothic Revival church buildings in Arkansas
Churches completed in 1916
Churches in Independence County, Arkansas
National Register of Historic Places in Independence County, Arkansas
Buildings and structures in Batesville, Arkansas
1916 establishments in Arkansas
Episcopal church buildings in Arkansas